Old Boys & Old Girls Club, simply known as Old Boys, is a Uruguayan sports club from the Carrasco neighbourhood of Montevideo. The club was founded by alumni of the city's British Schools.

Mainly known for its rugby union team, other sports practised at the club include boxing, field hockey, football, gymnastics, squash and tennis.

History 
The British Schools of Montevideo were founded in 1908. Six years later, the school's first alumni decided to create a social and sport club: The Old Boys Club. Female alumni followed suit some years later and founded the Old Girls Club in 1937.

After a friendly rugby union game against former players of the British y Montevideo CC in 1948, Old Boys decided to start a rugby section. Only two years later, Old Boys won the first ever national title in 1950.

Rugby would quickly become the club's main sport and the sport for which the club is mostly known today. The club is one of the most successful in Uruguay, having won the Campeonato Uruguayo 16 times.

Old Boys' main rival is Old Christians.

Notable all-time rugby players
 Juan Campomar
 Alfonso Cardoso
 Alejo Corral
 Joaquin Pastore
 José Malet

Titles

Rugby union
Campeonato Uruguayo (16):
 1950, 1952, 1956, 1957, 1959, 1962, 1963, 1964, 1965, 1967, 1968, 1969, 1975, 2010, 2013, 2021

References

External links
 

Uruguayan rugby union teams
Football clubs in Montevideo
Squash in Uruguay
Tennis in Uruguay
Uruguayan field hockey clubs
Multi-sport clubs in Uruguay
Sport in Montevideo
Carrasco, Montevideo
British immigration to Uruguay
Sports clubs established in 1914
Field hockey clubs established in 1914